The 2018–19 NK Istra 1961 season was the club's 58th season in existence and the 10th consecutive season in the top flight of Croatian football. Additionally, it was the first season under ownership of Spanish Baskonia - Alavés Group.

First-team squad

Transfers

In

Source: Glasilo Hrvatskog nogometnog saveza

Out

Source: Glasilo Hrvatskog nogometnog saveza

Total spending:  250,000 €

Total income:  0 €

Total expenditure:  250,000 €

Competitions

Overview

HT Prva liga

League table

Results summary

Results by round

Matches

Source: Croatian Football Federation

Relegation play-offs

Source: Croatian Football Federation

Croatian Football Cup

Source: Croatian Football Federation

Player seasonal records
Updated 13 April 2021

Goals

Source: Competitive matches

Clean sheets

Source: Competitive matches

Disciplinary record

Appearances and goals

Notes

References

External links

NK Istra 1961 seasons
Istra 1961